The Lexington Reds were a minor league baseball team based in Lexington, Kentucky. From 1922 to 1924, Lexington teams played exclusively as members of the Class D level Blue Grass League. After two seasons of playing as the "Reds," the 1924 Lexington team was known as the "Studebakers, " after the team owner reached an agreement with a local car dealership. Lexington hosted minor league home games at Stivers Park. The minor league Lexington Reds evolved from the semi-professional "Lexington Reds," which had future Commissioner of Baseball leader Happy Chandler and Baseball Hall of Fame member Earle Combs as teammates.

History
After Lexington first hosted a minor league baseball in 1885, with a team in the independent Interstate League, the Lexington Reds were preceded in minor league play by the 1916 Lexington Colts, who played their final season in the Class D level Ohio State League.

Following the demise of the minor league Colts, the Lexington "Reds" began play as a semi-professional team for multiple seasons. Future Commissioner of Baseball leader Happy Chandler and Baseball Hall of Fame member Earle Combs were teammates on the semi-pro Reds.

The 1922 Lexington Reds resumed minor league baseball play. The Reds began play as members of the six–team Class D level Blue Grass League. Some sources have the 1922 team moniker as the "Studebakers." The Cynthiana Merchants, Maysville Cardinals, Mount Sterling Essex, Paris Bourbons and Winchester Dodgers joined Lexington in beginning league play on April 23, 1922.

Beginning play in the 1922 Blue Grass League, the Reds finished in a last place tie in the regular season standings. In the overall standings, Lexington tied with the Winchester Dodgers, with identical records of 28–36. The Reds played the season under the direction of managers Pat Devereaux and Jim Park. The Reds finished 8.0 games behind the first place Paris Bourbons in the overall regular season standings. The Maysville Cardinals, with a 16–6 record, won the first half standings and Cynthiana, with a 25–17 record, won the second half standings, with the Maysville winning the championship playoff.

The Reds had several 1922 games changed or altered by Blue Grass League President Thomas M. Russell. Lexington's June 4, 1922, home game against Mt. Sterling was declared a “no contest” and was ordered to be replayed. Additionally, Russell ruled Lexington had used ineligible players in three victories and declared those games forfeits: August 27 (forfeit to Mt Sterling), September 9 (forfeit to Winchester), and September 30 (forfeit to Cynthiana). Lexington then forfeited its final three games of the season when the Reds failed to appear on October 2nd and 3rd for games against Mt. Sterling and on October 4th against Winchester. The final three games were forfeited after team owner Jesse Morton sold players who were popular with teammates and fans. The remaining players quit and the franchise was forced to forfeit the final three games of the season.

The Reds continued play in the 1923 Blue Grass League season. With a 44–49 record, the Reds finished in fifth place under manager Doug Harbison and ended the season 8.0 games behind the first place Cynthiana Cobblers. The 1923 team was also referred to as the "Reos." Cynthiana finished 1.0 game ahead of the second place Winchester Dodgers in the final standings of the six–team league. No playoffs were held in 1923.

In their final season of play, the 1924 Blue Grass League reduced from six teams to four, with Cynthiana, Paris and Winchester continuing league play with Lexington. The Lexington team continued league play and was known as the "Studebakers." The name change occurred after team owner Jesse Morton reached a sponsorship agreement with a local car dealership.
The Studebakers finished in third place in the final standings. With a record of 43–50 under managers Jesse Young and Jim Viox in the four–team Blue Grass League, Cynthiana finished 7.5 games behind the first place Paris Boosters. No playoffs were held following the conclusion of the 1924 regular season and the Blue Grass League permanently folded after the season.

Lexington next hosted minor league baseball in 1954, when the Lexington Colts played the season as members of the Class D level Mountain States League.

The ballpark
The Lexington minor league teams hosted minor league Blue Ridge League home games at Stivers Park. Stivers Park later served as the home ballpark of the Lexington Hard Hitters of the Negro leagues  from 1930 to 1932. The Hard Hitters were a member of the Blue Grass Colored Baseball League.

Timeline

Year–by–year records

Notable alumni

Eddie Bacon (1922)
Johnny Gill (1924)
Jim Park (1922, MGR)
Jim Viox (1924, MGR)

See also
Lexington Reds players

References

External links
Lexington - Baseball Reference

Professional baseball teams in Kentucky
Defunct baseball teams in Kentucky
Baseball teams established in 1922
Baseball teams disestablished in 1923
Blue Grass League teams
Lexington, Kentucky